The Moi International Sports Centre (abbreviated as MISC) is a multi-purpose stadium in Kasarani, Kenya. It was built in 1987 for the All-Africa Games held in Nairobi. The facilities include a 80,000 seat stadium with a running track and a pitch used for football and rugby union, a competition size swimming pool, an indoor arena and a 108-bed capacity hotel.  Located at 1,612 metres above sea level, it is slightly above 1 mile in altitude.

The stadium was closed in January 2010 for renovation works worth KSh.900 million/= and funded by a grant to the Government of Kenya by the Government of China. Chinese firm, Sheng Li Engineering Construction Company Limited was contracted to conduct the renovations and the stadium was reopened in March 2012 after completion of the renovations.

In April and May 2014, after terror attacks in Nairobi and Mombasa, the main stadium was used as a screening center as part of 'Operation Usalama Watch' during which thousands of people were rounded up and arrested by the Kenya Police.

The stadium hosted the 2017 World U18 Championships in Athletics and 2021 World Athletics U20 Championships.

Facilities

Kasarani Stadium (Moi International Sports Centre, Kasarani)

The main arena is used by the Kenya national football team for most of its home games, as well as Kenyan Premier League sides Mathare United and Tusker F.C.

Since 2013 the Safari Sevens rugby union tournament has been hosted at the Kasarani Stadium.

For sponsorship reasons, the stadium was known as Safaricom Stadium Kasarani.

Kasarani Indoor Arena
The indoor arena seats 5,000 and hosts volleyball, gymnastics, basketball, badminton, boxing, wrestling, martial arts and table tennis.

For sponsorship reasons, the arena is also known as Safaricom Indoor Arena.

Kasarani Aquatic Complex 
This arena consists of an Olympic competition pool 1.25 metres in depth, a recreational public diving pool and a children's pool.

The Stadium Hotel
This is a 108-room hotel located within the centre.

International matches

References

External links
Sports Stadia Management Board - a body governing several stadiums in Kenya
Photos at cafe.daum.net/stade
Photo at worldstadiums.com
Photo at fussballtempel.net
Nation.co.ke - Sh1bn facelift for Kasarani

Sports venues completed in 1987
Football venues in Kenya
Sports venues in Kenya
Sport in Nairobi
Athletics (track and field) venues in Kenya
Stadiums of the African Games
Kenya
Indoor arenas in Kenya
Multi-purpose stadiums in Kenya
Event venues established in 1987
Volleyball venues in Kenya
Basketball venues in Kenya
Chinese aid to Africa
1980s in Nairobi
1987 establishments in Kenya